Piquet is a card game.

Piquet may also refer to:

People
Georges Jules Piquet (fl. 1880s), French Governor General for Inde française in the Second French Colonial Empire under Third Republic
Jean-Baptiste Marie de Piquet, Marquess of Méjanes (1729-1786) French aristocrat
Laurence Piquet (fl. 1980s-present), French female television personality
Nelson Piquet (born 1952), Brazilian Formula One driver
Nelson Piquet Jr. (born 1985), Brazilian race car driver
Pedro Piquet (born 1998), Brazilian race car driver
René-Émile Piquet (born 1932), French politician

Sports
Piquet Racing (fl. 1992), a British Formula 3000 racing team set up by Nelson Piquet and Nigel Stepney
Piquet GP (2007-2009; formerly Minardi Piquet Sports) motorsports team, created from the merger of Piquet Sports (founded 2000) and GP Racing (founded 1997)
 Piquet Sports (2000-2007) motorsports team founded by Nelson Piquet Sr., that merged in 2007 into Piquet GP

Other uses
 Alternative obsolete spelling for picket or picquet
 Le Plessis-Piquet aka Piquet Castle, Le Plessis-Robinson, Ile-de-France, France; a medieval castle

See also

 Pickett (disambiguation)
 Piquette (disambiguation)